FanHouse was a sports website owned by AOL. Launched in September 2006, FanHouse was considered the Internet's most linked sports blog by aggregator BallHype won Editor & Publisher's 2008 EPpy Award for "Best Sports Blog", and was named as a finalist for the award in 2009.

In January 2009, FanHouse began hiring experienced print journalists, including Jay Mariotti of the Chicago Sun-Times, Kevin Blackistone of the Dallas Morning News, and Lisa Olson of the New York Daily News. FanHouse has continued to bolster its roster, hiring writers away from the Orlando Sentinel, Atlanta Journal-Constitution and Contra Costa Times, among others. FanHouse kept its stable of traditional bloggers as well, including widely published Michael David Smith and Elie Seckbach. Upon its 2006 launch, it became the first sports blog to pay many sports bloggers a per-post fee.

FanHouse was managed by executive producer Randy Kim. Previous executive producers have moved on to leadership positions at Yahoo! (Jamie Mottram), Yardbarker (Alana Nguyen) and NBC (John Clifford Ness). Many FanHouse bloggers have also moved on to other publications.

In January 2011, Sporting News announced a partnership with AOL to take over editorial control of FanHouse; the site was merged into that of Sporting News, and eventually discontinued.

References

External links
 Official website

American sport websites
Internet properties established in 2006
AOL